The national symbols of Syria are official and unofficial flags, icons or cultural expressions that are emblematic, representative or otherwise characteristic of Syria and of its culture.

Symbol

References 

National symbols of Syria